This is a list of Marathi language poets.

See also
List of Marathi writers
List of Indian poets

Chintaman Khanolkar (pen Name Arati Prabhu)

References

Marathi
 
Marathi